Children of Men had two soundtracks for the film, a film score by British composer John Tavener, and a soundtrack with various popular music acts.

Soundtrack 

Several songs that are heard during the movie, such as "Total State Machine" by Test Dept, "Omgyjya Switch7" by Aphex Twin, "Anti War Dub" by Digital Mystikz, "War Dub" by Pinch and "Life in a Glasshouse" by Radiohead are not included on the soundtrack. Furthermore, the tracks "Map of the Problematique" by Muse, "Gimme Shelter" by The Rolling Stones, and "Hoppípolla" by Sigur Rós were used in TV spots and trailers but were not featured in the film. Former Pulp frontman Jarvis Cocker's song "Running the World" is played in the credits of the film.

Track listing

Fragments of a Prayer from the Motion Picture "Children of Men" 

The film score, Fragments of a Prayer, was composed by John Tavener and released on Varèse Sarabande.

Director Alfonso Cuarón describes Tavener's "Fragments of a Prayer," as "a spiritual comment rather than a narrative support." The track features mezzo-soprano Sarah Connolly and is used as a powerful motif.  Unlike most composers, Tavener chose not to score the piece to the film, but to the screenplay instead.

The poetry of William Blake is featured in the lyrics to "Eternity's Sunrise", a work Tavener had previously written and dedicated to Princess Diana after
her death.

Gustav Holst's "Mars" is used in the film although it is not featured on the album.
"Eternity's Sunrise" is featured Oliver Stone's movie "Savages".

Track listing

Notes

External links 
Children of Men Soundtrack Review at Tracksounds

Compositions by John Tavener
Action film soundtracks
Film scores
2006 soundtrack albums
Science fiction film soundtracks